Vivian Cook may refer to:

Vivian Cook (linguist) (1940–2021), English linguist
Vivian E. Cook (born 1937), American politician
Vivian E. J. Cook (1889–1977) American educator and activist